Estonian Braille is the braille alphabet of the Estonian language.

Alphabet
Estonian Braille uses the international (read French) norms for the letters ä ö ü.  Š and ž are mirror-images of s and z, a strategy found in other alphabets.  Õ is the mirror-image of ä, as the mirror-image of o is used for ö.

{| class="wikitable" style="line-height: 1.2"
|- align=center
|  a
|  b
|  d
|  e
|  f
|  g
|  h
|  i
|  j
|- align=center
|  k
|  l
|  m
|  n
|  o
|  p
|  r
|  s
|  š
|- align=center
|  z
|  ž
|  t
|  u
|  v
|  õ
|  ä
|  ö
|  ü
|}

Punctuation
Punctuation is nearly identical to that of Finnish Braille.

Formatting

References

French-ordered braille alphabets
Estonian language